Lochmaea is a genus of beetles belonging to the family Chrysomelidae.

Species
Fifteen species are currently included in the genus:
 Lochmaea caprea (Linnaeus, 1758)
 Lochmaea cheni Lee, 2019
 Lochmaea crataegi (Forster, 1771)
 Lochmaea huanggangana Yang & Wang, 1998
 Lochmaea jungchani Lee, 2019
 Lochmaea lesagei Kimoto, 1996
 Lochmaea limbata Pic, 1898
 Lochmaea machulkai Roubal, 1926
 Lochmaea maculata Kimoto, 1979
 Lochmaea nepalica Medvedev, 2005
 Lochmaea scutellata (Chevrolat, 1840)
 Lochmaea singalilaensis Takizawa, 1990
 Lochmaea smetanai Kimoto, 1996
 Lochmaea suturalis (Thomson, 1866)
 Lochmaea tsoui Lee, 2019

References

Galerucinae
Chrysomelidae genera
Taxa named by Julius Weise